Härnösands FF was a Swedish football team from Härnösand in Härnösand Municipality. After the 2019 season, the team merged with Älgarna-Härnösand IF, resulting in the latter's assumption of the team's place in the 5th tier Division 3 Mellersta Norrland for the 2020 season.

Background
In 2007  Härnösands FF was established following a collaboration between IFK Härnösand and Älandsbro.  In 2008 the club won Division 4 Ångermanland followed by Division 3 Norra Norrland in 2009.  The club’s matches were played at Högslättens IP or Brovalla IP.

A merger took place at the end of the 1995 season between IFK Härnösand and Bondsjöhöjdens IK Härnösand and the following season the club was known as BIK/IFK Härnösand.  Another merger occurred during the period 2001–03 when the club was known as IFK Härnösand/Moffe BK.

The club was affiliated with the Ångermanlands Fotbollförbund.

While the latest incarnation of the club only played football, IFK Härnösand had long ago also had an active bandy department. IFK Härnösand became district champions of bandy in Västernorrland in 1913.

Season to season

Attendances

In recent seasons Härnösands FF have had the following average attendances:

Former players
 Svyatoslav Zubar

External links
 Härnösands FF – official site

Footnotes

 
Sport in Härnösand
Football clubs in Västernorrland County
Association football clubs established in 2007
2007 establishments in Sweden